Truffaldino from Bergamo is a 1976 Soviet two-part television musical film directed by Vladimir Vorobyov, based on the play Servant of Two Masters by Carlo Goldoni.

Plot
The action takes place in 18th century Venice. Rascal Truffaldino, who fled to wealthy Venice from poor Bergamo, gets employed as a servant to one signor by the name of Federico Rasponi, who in fact is a disguised girl Beatrice, Federico's sister. She, under the guise of her late brother, tries to find her lover, Florindo Aretusi, who was mistakenly accused of killing Federico in a duel and therefore fled to Venice.

The disguised Beatrice comes to the house of the Venetian merchant Pantalone, where everyone is sure that Signor Posoni has died. This is what is explained to poor Truffaldino, who by tradition went up into the house first to announce the owner's visit. After this visit, while the new owner was engrossed with business, Truffaldino served another signor and also got employed by him as a servant. However, after this, the first owner who has settled in the same hotel, Brighella returns, and Truffaldino decides to serve both to receive double salaries. The second owner is the same Florindo.

For some time, more due to his luck than resourcefulness, Truffaldino successfully serves both masters, getting into comic situations and coming out of them with agility. Beatrice (under the name Federico) has to pretend that she insists on a wedding with Clarice, the daughter of the old Pantalone, betrothed to the late Federico. But the latter loves Silvio, the son of Dr. Lombardi, whose arrival deprives the self-styled bridegroom's hopes of Clarice's hand.

In the end, everything ends well: Beatrice reunites with Florindo, Clarice marries Silvio, and Truffaldino finds a wife - Smeraldin, a servant in the house of Pantalone.

Cast
Konstantin Raikin as Truffaldino, a servant of two masters who is in love with Smeraldina (voiced by Mikhail Boyarsky)
Natalya Gundareva as Smeraldina, a servant in the house of Pantalone in love with Truffaldino (voiced by  Elena Driatskaya)
Valentina Kosobutskaya as Beatrice, sister of late Federico Rasponi (impersonating her brother) and lover of Florindo
Victor Kostetskiy as Florindo Aretusi, fugitive from Turin and fiancé of Beatrice
Elena Driatskaya as Clarice, daughter of Pantalone and betrothed of Silvio
Victor Krivonos as Silvio, son of Dr. Lombardi and betrothed of Clarice
Lev Petropavlovski as Pantalone, a Venetian banker and father of Clarice
Igor Sorkin as Dr. Lombardi, the father of Silvio
Alexander Bereznyak as Brighella, hotel owner and old friend of Rasponi siblings
Yevgeny Tilicheev as a captain of Turin guards

Production
Vladimir Vorobyov was the director of the Leningrad Musical Comedy Theatre, and most actors, with the exception of Konstantin Raikin and Natalya Gundareva were employed at his theatre.

The film was shot in Lenfilm pavilions, with some scenes filmed on the Gulf of Finland.

References

External links

Soviet musical comedy films
1970s musical comedy films
Soviet television films
Adaptations of works by Carlo Goldoni
Lenfilm films
Soviet films based on plays
1976 comedy films
1976 films